Papyrus Oxyrhynchus L 3525 is a copy of the apocryphal Gospel of Mary  in Greek. It is a papyrus manuscript formed in a roll. The manuscript had been assigned palaeographically to the 3rd century. It is one of the three manuscripts and one of the two Greek manuscripts of the Gospel of Mary. It is shorter than Papyrus Rylands 463.

Description 
It survives only as a small fragment of a single sheet (probably roll). The fragment is broken on all sides. The fragment covers the material contained in 9.1-10.10 of the Coptic manuscript. The reconstruction of the missing parts (especially the starts and ends of the lines) is not an easy task and depends on the Coptic text. There are some textual differences between the Greek fragment and the Coptic text.

It was written in ca. 50 letters per line. The nomina sacra are written in abbreviated form. The manuscript was discovered in Oxyrhynchus. The text was edited by P. J. Parsons. The manuscript currently is housed at the Papyrology Rooms of the Sackler Library at Oxford with the shelf number P. Oxy. L 3525.

See also 
 Gospel of Mary
 Oxyrhynchus Papyri
 Papyrus Rylands 463

References

Further reading 
 P. J. Parsons, 3525: Gospel of Mary, in The Oxyrhynchus Papyri (London: Egypt Exploration Society, 1983).
 D. Lührmann, Die griechischen Fragmente des Mariaevangeliums POxy 3525 und PRyl 463, Novun Testamentum 30 (1988), 321–338. 
 Christopher Mark Tuckett, The Gospel of Mary, Oxford University Press, Oxford 2007.

External links 

Image: P.Oxy. L 3525 (© Copyright the Egypt Exploration Society).
 P.Oxy.LXXII 3525 from Papyrology at Oxford's "POxy: Oxyrhynchus Online"
 P. Oxy. 50.3525 - an exact transcript

3rd-century biblical manuscripts
Gnostic Gospels
3525
Sackler library manuscripts